Shatter is a 1974 action film starring Stuart Whitman, Lung Ti, Lily Li, Anton Diffring and Peter Cushing. It was the second and final international co-production between Hammer Film Productions of England and Shaw Brothers Studio of Hong Kong. The film was shot entirely on location in Hong Kong.

Plot outline
Shatter (Stuart Whitman) is a hitman contracted to kill a dictator in a certain African country. He completes his assignment and returns to Hong Kong to collect his fee, only to learn that he himself is the next target of the assassination because he was intended to be used as a scapegoat by his client for a larger political agenda. Being pursued by various government agencies and gangsters, Shatter seeks help from a master martial artist Tai Pah (Lung Ti) and promises to share half of his fee in exchange for Tai Pah's protection and assistance in recovering his fee.

Cast
Stuart Whitman - Shatter
Peter Cushing - Rattwood
Anton Diffring - Hans Leber
Lung Ti - Tai Pah
Lily Li - Mai-Mee
Yemi Ajibade - Ansabi M'Goya / Dabula M'Goya

Production
In May 1972, Michael Carreras returned to London from the Cannes Film Festival with a co-production deal that was made with the Canadian producer George Brown.  Don Houghton provided Brown with a script for an action film originally titled Shoot. The film was originally set to start filming in Canada in August 1972 but was halted when Brown went bankrupt, leading to the project being shelved. Houghton's father-in-law had connections with Run Run Shaw, who ran Shaw Brothers studios. The original meetings between Carreras were set up for the production of the film The Legend of the 7 Golden Vampires, which also led to the production of Houghton's unused script for Shoot which was developed into Shatter.

Shatter was filmed from December 17, 1973 through January 15, 1974 on location in Hong Kong, including Kai Tak Airport. Monte Hellman was signed on to direct but was fired during production less than two weeks into shooting, leaving Carreras to finish the film himself. Carreras complained "In my opinion, the action scenes lack excitement, the dialogue scenes are dull and Hong Kong looks like a slum. I just don't know how to salvage it." Among the cast was Peter Cushing, it would be his last feature film for Hammer. Cushing's scenes were filmed in four days . A new score was added when the original Shaw Brothers score horrified music director Philip Martell who thought it "absolutely appalling".

Release
Shatter was not released initially in the United Kingdom. Shatter was released in the United States as Call Him Mr. Shatter by Avco Embassy Pictures in March 1975. Shatter remained unreleased in the United Kingdom. until being distributed by EMI in September 1977.

Plans to turn Shatter into a television series starring Stuart Whitman were shelved. It was released on VHS in the United States with the alternative title They Call Me Mr. Shatter.

Reception
Variety gave the film a negative review, finding the film "dull and sloppy, though there are a few scenes of entertaining hokum" noting Ti Lung's martial arts sequences being "choreographed with unusual skill, but that kind of stuff is getting stale by now" Carreras later spoke about the film stating it was "unfortunately, a bad picture, no question about it. We ran into all sorts of problems, and like all pictures that are bad, I think it was badly conceived from the start. One did all sorts of things to try and save it, but it didn't work."
However, as is the case with many otherwise 'bad' films, interest can be found in the 'on location' footage, here of early Seventies Hong Kong.

References

Sources

External links

1975 films
British action films 
Hong Kong action films
English-language Hong Kong films
Shaw Brothers Studio films
Hammer Film Productions films
Films directed by Michael Carreras
Films about contract killing
1974 martial arts films
1974 films
Embassy Pictures films
1970s English-language films
1970s British films
1970s Hong Kong films